Paul Johnstone (1930–1996) was a South Africa rugby union player.

Paul Johnstone may also refer to:

Paul Johnstone (Ontario politician), Canadian politician
Paul Neil Milne Johnstone (1953–2007), journalist who shared a room with Douglas Adams at school and subsequently appeared as a supporting character in The Hitchhiker's Guide to the Galaxy
Paul Johnstone, actor, Mad Max (1979)

See also
Paul Johnston (disambiguation)
Paul Johnson (disambiguation)